Nuremberg Funnel (German: Nürnberger Trichter) is a jocular description of a mechanical way of learning and teaching. On the one hand, it evokes the image of a student learning his lessons with this kind of teaching method almost without effort and on the other hand, a teacher teaching everything to even the "stupidest" pupil. Can also reference forceful teaching of someone's ideas, ideology, etc.

Etymology 
The phrase "Nuremberg Funnel", familiar in German-speaking countries, has its origin in the title of a poetics textbook by the founders of the Pegnesischer Blumenorden and the Nuremberg poet, Georg Philipp Harsdörffer (1607–1658), which appeared in Nuremberg in 1647 under the title of Poetischer Trichter. Die Teutsche Dicht- und Reimkunst, ohne Behuf der lateinischen Sprache, in VI Stunden einzugießen (Poetic funnel. The art of German poetry and rhyme, without using the Latin language, poured in over VI hours). Because of the wide distribution of the work, the expression "Nuremberg funnel" became a common idiomatic expression.

The idiom "to funnel something in" (to drum something in) or "to get something funneled in" (to get something drummed in) is even older than the image of the "Nuremberg Funnel"; it was first recorded in the collection of proverbs by Sebastian Franck in 1541, but without reference to the city of Nuremberg.

Literature 
 Franz Kaiser: Der Nürnberger Trichter. Illustrated by Emeli Werzinger. Nuremberg: Sebaldus-Verlag, 1946, 12 pages, IDN: 354205862.
 Hans Recknagel; Rolf Veit: Wagenseils Nürnberger Trichter. Zur Geschichte einer Redensart. In: Mitteilungen der Altnürnberger Landschaft e.V., Booklet 1, 2001, pp. 571–581.
 Dagmar Hirschfelder: Der "Nürnberger Trichter" – Ein Allheilmittel gegen die Dummheit? In: KulturGUT – Aus der Forschung des Germanischen Nationalmuseums, booklet 8, 2006, pp. 3–5.

External links 
 German First Day School Portraits: Funnel / Trichter

References 

German words and phrases
Learning